Alexander Parker (21 June 1628 – 8 March 1689) was a Quaker preacher and author.

He was born on 21 June 1628 at Chipping, Lancashire, England the son of Robert Parker. He was convinced and became a Quaker preacher, travelling widely in England and Scotland.

He wrote: 
A Testimony of the Light Within (1657)
A Discovery of Satans Wiles (1657)
Testimony of the Appearance of God (1658)
A Tryall of a Christian (1658)
A Call out of Egypt (1659)
 A Testimony of Truth (1659)
An Epistle to Friends (1660)

Parker was one of eighty-four Quakers who founded the six-weeks' meeting for the management of Quaker affairs, in October 1671.

On 8 August 1683 he, with George Whitehead, and Gilbert Latey, presented an address to King Charles II of England at Windsor on behalf of persecuted Friends. Parker accompanied George Fox to the Netherlands in 1684.

He died in London on 8 March 1689.

One of his letters to Friends, advising them on the holding of Meetings for Worship was included in current printed guidance for British Quakers.

References

1628 births
1689 deaths
Quaker ministers
People from Ribble Valley (district)
17th-century Quakers
17th-century English people